Kibaropsis is a monotypic genus of plant in the Monimiaceae family. It is endemic to New Caledonia. Its only species is Kibaropsis caledonica. Phylogenetic studies suggest that it is nested in the more widespread genus Hedycarya, where it has once been placed.

References

Monimiaceae genera
Endemic flora of New Caledonia
Monotypic Laurales genera